is a Japanese singer and songwriter. She is contracted with the Giza Studio record label

Aika is best known for writing songs for several artists under Giza Studio, notably Rina Aiuchi, Mai Kuraki, Aya Kamiki, U-ka Saegusa in db and Zard, among others. Many of her songs have been featured in anime shows such as Detective Conan (or Case Closed in the US), MÄR, Golgo 13, Detective School Q and Secret of Cerulean Sand. To a lesser extent, she released three studio albums containing cover versions of her own song written for other artists, in English and Japanese.

Discography

Studio albums

Music provided for artist
★　album ☆ single/coupling

Wands
Ashita Moshi Kimi ga Kowaretemo ☆

Field of View
 Aoi Kasa de ☆

Deen
 Tooi Tooi Mirai he ☆

Maki Ohguro
Taiyou no Kuni he Ikou yo Sugu ni -Sora Tobu Yume ni Notte ☆

Zard
Shoujo no Koro ni Modotta Mitai ni ☆
 Get U're Dream ☆
 Hero (Toki no Tsubasa) ★
 Toki no Tsubasa, Tenshi no You na Egao de, Kanashii Hodo Kyou wa Ame demo (Tomatteita Tokei ga Ima Ugokidashita) ★
 Ashita wo Yume Mite ☆
 Motto Chikaku de Kimi no Yokogao Mitetai ☆
 Hitomi Tojite ☆
 Kakegae no Nai Mono ☆
 Kyō wa Yukkuri Hanasō ☆
 Hoshi no Kagayaki yo/Natsu wo Matsu Sail no Yō ni ☆ 
 Sayonara made no Distance, Kimi to no Fureai, Separate Ways, Tsuki ni Negai wo (Kimi to no Distance) ★
 Kanashii Hodo Anata ga Suki/Karatto Ikō! ☆
 Heart ni Hi wo Tsukete ☆
 Glorious Mind ☆

Sweet Velvet
 I Just Feel So Sweet Again ☆
 Flame of Love ☆
 Lazy Drive ☆
 After All, Fairplay, Sweeter baby, Blue, So Good (I Just Feel So "Sweet") ★

Mai Kuraki
 Love, Day After Tomorrow ☆
 Stay by My Side ☆
 Secret of My Heart ☆
 Simply Wonderful ☆
 Trying To Find My Way ☆
 Delicious Way, Happy Days (Delicious Way) ★
 Reach for the Sky ☆
 Tsumetai Umi/Start in My Life ☆
 Always ☆
 Can't Forget Your Love ☆
 Brand New Day, Itsuka wa Ano Sora ni, The ROSE ~melody in the sky~ (Perfect Crime) ★
 Like a Star in the Night ☆
 Key to my heart, Loving you, Can't forget your love, Fukigen no Kuni, Fantasy (Fairy Tale) ★
 Time After Time (Hana Mau Machi de) ☆
 If I Believe, Tonight, I feel close to you (If I Believe) ★
 Lover Boy ☆
 Honey, feeling for me; Love, needing; Tell me what, Love sick, Chance for you, I sing a song for you (Fuse of Love) ★
 Growing of My Heart ☆
 Through the River ☆
 State of mind, Voice of Safest Place (Diamond Wave) ★
 Shiroi Yuki ☆
 Season of Love ☆
 You and Music and Dream ☆
 Ichibyōgoto ni Love for You ☆
 Revive ☆
 Summer Time Gone ☆
 I Promise, Tomorrow is The Last Time (Future Kiss) ★
 1000 Mankai no Kiss ☆
 Another Day, Another World (Over The Rainbow) ★
 Sakura Sakura... ☆
 You Can ★
 We Are Happy Women ☆

Rina Aiuchi
 Close To Your Heart, Black eyes,Blue tears ☆
 It's crazy for you!, Golden moonlight ☆
 Ohh! Paradise Taste!! ☆
 Koi wa Thrill, Shock, Suspense ☆
 Faith ☆
 Run up ☆
 Forever You ~Eien ni Kimi to~ ☆
 Can you feel the Power of Words? ☆
 Power of Words, Spark (Power of Words) ★
 Double hearted (AIR) ★
 Start ☆
 Boom-Boom-Boom ☆
 STEP UP! (Playgirl) ★
 Glorious ☆
 Miracle ☆
 Delight (Delight) ★
 Magic ☆
 Hanabi ☆
 Sing a Song (Last Scene ★

The Tambourines
 Easy Game　☆
 Hijack brandnew days　☆
 Don't stop music　☆

Soul Crusaders
 Safety Love　☆
 Baby Sweet Sunshine　☆
 Lonesome Tonight ~Kimi Dake Mitsumeteru~　☆

Azumi Uehara
 Aoi Aoi Kono Hoshi ni　☆
 Special Holynight　☆

Akane Sugazaki
 Beginning dream
 Koigokoro
 Truth
 Haru no You Damari no Naka de
 Kimi ni Aitakute

Hayami Kishimoto
 Mei Q?!~Meikyuu~Make you
 Aisuru Kimi ga Soba ni Ireba
 Mienai Story
 Kaze ni Mukai Arukuyouni
 Sutekina Yume Miyoune

U-ka Saegusa in dB
 Tears go by
 CHU☆TRUE LOVE
 I'm in Love
 Shocking Blue
 Saigo no Kiss wa Mizu no you ni Tsumetakatta
 Nemuru Kimi no Yokogao ni Hohoemi wo
 Kokoro ga Tomaranai
 Mune Ippai Kono Ai wo Dare yori Kimi ni
 Hekonda Kimochi Tokasu Kimi
 Egao de Iyouyo
 Hand to Hand
 I Shall be Released
 Sotto Yasashii Kaze ni Fukarenagara
 Tobitatenai Watashi ni Anata ga Tsubasa wo Kureta
 Sora Tobu Ano Shiroi Kumo no You ni
 Mou Kimi wo Hitori ni Sasenai
 Shiro no Fantasy
 Kono Sekai ni Kimi ga Iru Dake de
 Natsu no Owari ni Anata e no Tegami Kakitometeimasu
 Daremo ga Kitto Dareka no Santa Claus
 Gomen ne Ima mo mada Kimi wo Aishiteru kara
 Itsumo Sugao no Watashi de Itai
 Yorugao no Onshitsu
 Sakihokore
 Wasurenaide

Shiori Takei
 Shizukanaru Melody　☆
 Tsunagari　☆
 Sekai Tomete　☆
 Kimi wo Shiranai Machi he　☆
 Tonari, Lost in Paradise (Second tune ~Sekai Tomete~)　★
 Kitto mou Koi ni wa Naranai　☆
 Milky Way (Diary)　★

Ai Takaoka
 Kimi no Soba de
 Hikari to Kaze to Kimi no Naka de

Yumi Shizukusa
 Taisetsu na Mono
 Do you love me ?
 Who you gonna be
 Hanakagari

Aiko Kitahara
 Fuyu Urara　☆

Aya Kamiki
 Nemutteita Kimochi Nemutteita Kokoro
 Misekase no I love you
 Ashita no Tameni
 Sunday Morning
 Summer Memories
 Sekai wa Soredemo Kawariwashinai
 Kimi Sarishi Yuuwaku

Caos Caos Caos
 Tear drops　☆

Natsuiro
 Kimi no Egao ni Konnani Koishiteru
 Beautiful, If, Ano Natsuzora no Sora he to Tsuzuku, Always be my baby, Yoru ni Dakarete, For Dear (Ano Natsuzora no Sora he)
 Natsu no Taiyou no sei ni shite
 A day~ Ryokufuu no Kisetsu~, Everything for you, Sayonara Precious, Akusenkuutou no One Way Love (Summer Spur!)

References

External links
 Official website (in English and Japanese)
 

1977 births
Living people
Being Inc. artists
Japanese songwriters
Musicians from Osaka Prefecture
21st-century Japanese singers
21st-century Japanese women singers